Acacia conniana is a shrub belonging to the genus Acacia and the subgenus Juliflorae that is endemic to the southern coast of western Australia.

Description
It has dark red-brown to grey coloured bark that is longitudinally fissured at base of main trunks. The glabrous branches have 
resinous new tips. Like most species of Acacia it has phyllodes rather than true leaves. It blooms from September to November producing yellow flowers. The cylindrical flower-spikes are found on short axillary branchlets. The seed pods that form after flowering have a linear shape and are raised over each seed.

Taxonomy
The species was first formally described by the botanist Bruce Maslin in 1985 as part of the work Acacia conniana, a new name for a Western Australian Acacia section Juliflorae species (Leguminosae: Mimosoideae) as published in the journal Nuytsia. It was reclassified as Racosperma connianum by Leslie Pedley in 2003 then transferred back to the Acacia genus in 2006. Other synonyms include Acacia cognata and Acacia acuminata var. latifolia.
It is closely related to Acacia doratoxylon and Acacia lasiocalyx.

Distribution
It is native to an area along the south coast of the Goldfields-Esperance region of Western Australia from around the east of Esperance at Cape Le Grand to east of Cape Arid National Park around Israelite Bay where it is found amongst granite outcrops growing in shallow skeletal soils with isolated populations around Pingelly. It is also found on some islands on the Recherche Archipelago including Middle Island and Mondrain Island.

See also
List of Acacia species

References

conniana
Acacias of Western Australia
Plants described in 1985
Taxa named by Bruce Maslin